Hanna Zavecz (born 21 August 1985) is an Australian basketball player who has played for the Australian Institute of Sport (AIS), Bendigo Spirit and Bulleen Boomers in the WNBL.  She has also played university basketball in the United States for the University of Wyoming.  She earned her first call up to the Australia women's national basketball team in 2010 and participated in the national team's 2012 Summer Olympics qualifying campaign.

Personal
Hanna Elizabeth Zavecz was born on 21 August 1985 and is from Melbourne, Victoria. Her parents are Peter and Marianne and she has two older brothers. Sports Illustrated said she was six-foot tall. Zavecz attended the University of Wyoming from 2004 to 2008, where she majored in human nutrition and food. One of her biggest challenges moving from Melbourne to Wyoming in to attend university was the cold winter weather.

Basketball

Zavecz plays as a guard and forward, and is considered a "tall".

Zavecz played representative basketball for Country Victoria at the under-16 and under-18 levels at the national championships. In 2001, she was the captain of her side on the under-16 level. She represented Victoria in the Australian national under-20 championships in 2003, where her team took home gold. Prior to going to the United States, she played for Bulleen in the Victorian Basketball League where she was coached by Raquel Conel.

University
Zavecz considered several United States universities including Idaho State, Georgia Tech and Memphis before choosing the University of Wyoming, where was played forward from 2004 to 2008. Her university coach had never seen her play before she came to play for the team.  Zavecz's club coach convinced him to offer her a scholarship.

In Zavecz's first Conference game as a freshman, playing BYU University, she scored 32 points and had 7 blocks setting two Freshman records for the conference. In her first year, she was a Second Team All-Mountain West Conference (MWC) selection. In her second season with the team, they won 21 games.  Nationally, they were ranked 18th. In her third season with the team, they were 16–1 to start the season. She was named by the Associated Press as an Honorable Mention All-American in 2008. Over the course of her career there, she averaged 14 points per game, 6.1 rebounds per game, 3.6 assists per game, 48 total blocked shots and 47 total steals. She was a three-time First-Team All-MWC player and two times Defensive Player of the Year for the Mountain West Conference.

Zavecz was one of seven international players to have played for Wyoming through the 2011–12 season.

Wyoming statistics

Source

Europe
Zavecz played for the Uniqa Euroleasing Sopron, Hungary in 2012. In the season, she played 11 games, averaging 8.2 points per game and 4.5 rebounds per game.

WNBL
Zavecz has played in Australia's WNBL.
In 2002 and 2003, she had a scholarship with the Australian Institute of Sport and played for the AIS WNBL team. While at the AIS, they ingrained in her the need to eat healthy. While on road trips with the WNBL AIS team, they were never allowed to eat fast food. She signed with the Bendigo Spirit in 2008. She played for the Bendigo Spirit in the 2008/2009 season in the forward position. Going into the 17th round, she was averaging 6.2 points and 4.6 rebounds per game. She missed six games in the first sixteen rounds because she was injury, most of them before the WNBL Christmas break. She played for the Bulleen Boomers in 2010/2011, her first year with the team. Early in the season, she missed the first two games which were Bulleen losses.

National team
Zavecz earned her first call up to the Australia women's national basketball team in 2010 and participated in a tour of China, USA and Hungary in mid-2010. In late July 2011, she played in a three-game test series against China played in Queensland. In the first game against China, Australia won 73–67 with Zavec contributing in key moments in the fourth quarter. She played in the 2012 Summer Olympic qualifying game against the New Zealand women's national basketball team. She was named to the 2012 Australia women's national basketball team.

References

External links

 Hanna Zavecz on Twitter

Australian women's basketball players
Australian people of European descent
Australian Institute of Sport basketball (WNBL) players
1985 births
Living people
Wyoming Cowgirls basketball players
Sportswomen from Victoria (Australia)
Canberra Capitals players
Basketball players from Melbourne
Forwards (basketball)
Guards (basketball)